Biehle may refer to:

Biehle, Missouri, a village in Perry County, Missouri, United States

People with the surname
Alfred Biehle (born 1926), German politician
August Biehle (1885–1979), American Modernist painter